The Runcșor is a river in the Valea Roșie river basin in Romania. It rises in the Pădurea Craiului Mountains and flows westwards until it disappears in the Runcșor sinkhole. Most of the discharge flows into the Toplicioara or Bulbuci karst spring, which feeds a right tributary of the Șoimuș.

References

Rivers of Romania
Rivers of Bihor County